Flaying, also known colloquially as skinning, is a method of slow and painful execution in which skin is removed from the body. Generally, an attempt is made to keep the removed portion of skin intact.

Scope
A dead animal may be flayed when preparing it to be used as human food, or for its hide or fur. This is more commonly called skinning.

Flaying of humans is used as a method of torture or execution, depending on how much of the skin is removed. This is often referred to as flaying alive. There are also records of people flayed after death, generally as a means of debasing the corpse of a prominent enemy or criminal, sometimes related to religious beliefs (e.g. to deny an afterlife); sometimes the skin is used, again for deterrence, esoteric/ritualistic purposes, etc. (e.g. scalping).

Causes of death
Dermatologist Ernst G. Jung notes that the typical causes of death due to flaying are shock, critical loss of blood or other body fluids, hypothermia, or infections, and that the actual death is estimated to occur from a few hours up to a few days after the flaying. Hypothermia is possible, as skin provides natural insulation and is essential for maintaining body temperature.

History

Assyrian tradition 

Ernst G. Jung, in his Kleine Kulturgeschichte der Haut ("A short cultural history of the skin"), provides an essay in which he outlines the Neo-Assyrian tradition of flaying human beings. Already from the times of Ashurnasirpal II (r. 883–859 BC), the practice is displayed and commemorated in both carvings and official royal edicts. The carvings show that the actual flaying process might begin at various places on the body, such as at the crus (lower leg), the thighs, or the buttocks.

In their royal edicts, the Neo-Assyrian kings seem to gloat over the terrible fate they imposed upon their captives, and that flaying seems, in particular, to be the fate meted out to rebel leaders. Jung provides some examples of this triumphant rhetoric. From Ashurnasirpal II:

The Rassam cylinder in the British Museum describes this:

Other examples 
Searing or cutting the flesh from the body was sometimes used as part of the public execution of traitors in medieval Europe. A similar mode of execution was used as late as the early 18th century in France; one such episode is graphically recounted in the opening chapter of Michel Foucault's Discipline and Punish (1979).

In 1303, the treasury of Westminster Abbey was robbed while holding a large sum of money belonging to King Edward I. After the arrest and interrogation of 48 monks, three of them, including the subprior and sacrist, were found guilty of the robbery and flayed. Their skin was attached to three doors as a warning against robbers of church and state. At St Michael & All Angels' Church in Copford in Essex, England, it is claimed that human skin was found attached to an old door, though evidence seems elusive.

In Chinese history, Sun Hao, Fu Sheng and Gao Heng were known for removing skin from people's faces. The Hongwu Emperor flayed many servants, officials and rebels. Hai Rui suggested that his emperor flay corrupt officials. The Zhengde Emperor flayed six rebels, and Zhang Xianzhong also flayed many people. Lu Xun said the Ming dynasty was begun and ended by flaying.

Examples and depictions of flayings

Artistic

 One of the plastinated exhibits in Body Worlds includes an entire posthumously flayed skin, and many of the other exhibits have had their skin removed.

Mythological
 In Greek mythology, Marsyas, a satyr, was flayed alive after losing a musical contest to Apollo.
 Also according to Greek mythology, Aloeus is said to have had his wife flayed.
 In Aztec mythology, Xipe Totec is the flayed god of death and rebirth. Captured enemy warriors were flayed annually as sacrifices to him.

Historical
 Yahu-Bihdi, ruler of Hamath, was flayed alive by the Assyrians under Sargon II.
 According to Herodotus, Sisamnes, a corrupt judge under Cambyses II of Persia, was flayed for accepting a bribe. 
 The Talmud discusses how Rabbi Akiva was flayed alive by the Romans for publicly teaching the Torah.
 Catholic and Orthodox tradition holds that Saint Bartholomew was flayed before being crucified.
 In 202 AD, Saint Charalambos was reportedly tortured mercilessly at the age of 113 during the reign of Septimius Severus. The torturers lacerated his body with iron hooks and scraped all the skin from his body.
In 260 AD, the Roman emperor Valerian was seized during a parley by Shapur I, king of Persia, at Edessa. According to some accounts he was flayed alive.
 Mani, founding prophet of Manichaeism, was said to have been flayed or beheaded (c. 275).
 Vasak Mamikonyan, commander-in-chief of the Armenian army during the reign of Arsaces (Arshak) II, king of Armenia, was flayed alive on the order of Shapur II, after he, along with Arsaces, was captured and imprisoned by the Persian king. His skin was then filled with hay and put before Arsaces to further mock and psychologically torture the imprisoned Armenian king. (c. 367).
 In March 415, Hypatia of Alexandria, a Neoplatonist philosopher, was murdered by a Christian mob of Nitrian monks who accused her of paganism. They stripped her naked, skinned her with ostraca (pot shards), and then burned her remains.
 Totila is said to have ordered the bishop of Perugia, Herculanus, to be flayed when he captured that city in 549.
 In 991 AD, during a Viking raid in England, a Danish Viking is said to have been flayed by London locals for ransacking a church. Alleged human skin found on a local church door has, for many years, been considered as proof for this legend, but a deeper analysis made during the production of the 2001 BBC documentary, Blood of the Vikings, came to the conclusion that the preserved skin came from a cow hide and was part of a 19th-century hoax.
 Pierre Basile was flayed alive and all defenders of the chateau hanged on 6 April 1199, by order of the mercenary leader Mercadier, for shooting and killing King Richard I of England with a crossbow at the siege of Châlus, in March 1199.
 In 1314, the brothers Aunay, who were lovers of the daughters-in-law of king Philip IV of France, were flayed alive, then castrated and beheaded, and their bodies were exposed on a gibbet (Tour de Nesle Affair). The extreme severity of their punishment was due to the lèse majesté nature of the crime. 
 In 1323, the Mexica tribe asked for Yaocihuatl, daughter of Achicometl, ruler of Culhuacan in marriage. Unknown to him, she was sacrificed, with the priest appearing during the festival dinner wearing her skin as part of the ritual.
 In 1404 or 1417, the Hurufi Imad ud-Din Nesîmî, an Islamic poet of Turkic extraction, was flayed alive, apparently on orders of a Timurid governor, and for heresy.
In 1490, Krokodeilas Kladas who led a revolt in the Morea was flayed alive by the Ottomans when caught in battle.
In August 1571, Marcantonio Bragadin, a defeated Venetian commander, was flayed to death by the Ottomans, causing enormous outrage in Venice and perhaps inspiring Titian's Flaying of Marsyas.
 In September 1611, Dionysios the Philosopher (or Dionysios Skylosophos) was flayed alive by the Ottomans after a failed revolt in Ioannina. His skin was filled with hay and was paraded.
In 1657, the Polish Jesuit martyr, Andrew Bobola, was burned, half strangled, partly flayed alive, and killed by a sabre stroke by Eastern Orthodox Cossacks.
 In 1771, Daskalogiannis, a Cretan rebel against the Ottoman Empire, was flayed alive, and it is said that he suffered in dignified silence.
 In the United States, Nat Turner, leader of a rebellion against slavery in Virginia, was hanged on November 11, 1831. His body was then flayed, his skin being used to make purses as souvenirs.
 In Marcel Ophuls's documentary, Hôtel Terminus: The Life and Times of Klaus Barbie, the daughter of a French Resistance leader claims her father was tortured, including being flayed, by Klaus Barbie during his time at Lyon in 1942–1944.
 In 1957, a victim of Ed Gein was found "dressed out like a deer". Gein appears to have been influenced by the then-current stories about the Nazis collecting body parts in order to make lampshades and other items. His story fueled the inspiration of the fictional characters Norman Bates (in Psycho), Jame Gumb "Buffalo Bill" (The Silence of the Lambs), and Leatherface (The Texas Chainsaw Massacre).
 In the 2010s, several Mexican cartel gore videos were leaked to the Internet, depicting flaying used as an extremely graphic torture technique. The victims had mainly their faces flayed off, while they were still alive.

Fictional
 In Thomas Harris's novel The Silence of the Lambs, the character Buffalo Bill is a serial killer whose modus operandi includes flaying his victims.
 In the fantasy series A Song of Ice and Fire and Game of Thrones, the Boltons of the Dreadfort flay their prisoners during their independent reign, until their defeat by House Stark. The sigil of House Bolton is a flayed man with arms spread on a pink field (the TV adaptation depicts the man tied upside down to a saltire), with the words "Our Blades are Sharp." The Boltons apparently gave up this practice 1,000 years before the series begins; however, the sadistic bastard and heir of the family, Ramsay Snow/Bolton, delights in flaying his victims and wants to restore its use.
 The titular monster/alien species of the Predator film franchise, the Yautja, flays its victims.
 In Haruki Murakami's novel The Wind-Up Bird Chronicle (1994–1995), the character Mamiya is traumatised by having witnessed a colleague being flayed to death in Manchukuo, in the late 1930s.
 In the 2008 French movie Martyrs, a female character is flayed alive by a secret philosophical society seeking to discover the secrets of the afterlife through the creation of "martyrs". 
 In the 2012 film Dredd, drug kingpin Ma-Ma orders three rogue dealers to be flayed alive before being tossed off a balcony.
 In the sixth season of the television series Buffy the Vampire Slayer, the witch Willow Rosenberg uses dark magic to flay Warren Mears alive in retaliation for the murder of her girlfriend, Tara Maclay.
 In the 2019 folk horror film Midsommar, one of the main characters, Mark, is flayed off-screen and his executioner is later seen wearing his face as a mask and his legs as a pair of pants.
 In the 2020 film Hunter Hunter, Anne, one of the main characters, flays the face and upper body from the man who murdered her husband and daughter.

See also 
 Anthropodermic bibliopegy (books bound in human skin)
 Degloving
 Excarnation
 Scalping

References

Bibliography

External links

 1575 Painting: The Flaying of Marsyas, by Titian.

Capital punishment
Corporal punishments
Execution methods
Torture
Skin